Villa Elaine is Remy Zero's second studio album, released in 1998 and produced for Geffen Records. After recording the album, Radiohead, who the band had toured with previously, added Remy Zero to their tour in support of OK Computer. The band also toured with Scottish band Travis. The album became popular for the song "Prophecy", which was used on the soundtrack for the movies She's All That and The Last Kiss. The song "Fair" was used on Zach Braff's Grammy award-winning soundtrack to the movie Garden State and, more recently, featured in the movie Fanboys. "Hermes Bird" was used in the TV series Felicity and Charmed. "Problem" appeared on the soundtrack for the Drew Barrymore film Never Been Kissed.

Track listing
"Hermes Bird" – 3:56
"Prophecy" – 3:24
"Life in Rain" – 3:36
"Hollow" – 6:21
"Problem" – 3:29
"Whither Vulcan" – 4:13
"Gramarye" – 5:16
"Yellow Light" – 4:03
"Motorcycle" – 3:38
"Fair" – 3:56
"Goodbye Little World" – 13:29
There is a bonus track beginning around 11:15 through the final song "Goodbye Little World", called "Instrumental 523".

Credits
Artwork By [Art Direction And Design] – Bill Merryfield, Remy Zero
Assorted Keyboards – Benmont Tench, David Bottrill, Patrick Warren
Mastered By – Stephen Marcussen
Mixed By – Alan Moulder
A & R – Tony Berg
Legal – Lenard & Gonzalez
Managed By – Richard Brown
Performer – Cedric LeMoyne, Cinjun Tate, Gregory Slay, Jeffrey Cain, Shelby Tate
Photography – Corinne Day
Additional Photography – Jeffery Cain, Shelby Tate
Producer – David Bottrill, Remy Zero
Technician [Studio Assistant] – Casey McMackin, Dave Reed, Greg Fidelman, Mike Bumgartner, Todd Burke
Mixed at RAK Studio, London (except tracks 3, 6, and 11 mixed at A&M Studios, Los Angeles)
Audio liberally amassed and stored at the following studios in Los Angeles: Sound City, Grandmaster, The Hook, Studio 9 and Zeitgeist.
Mastered at Precision Mastering, Los Angeles, CA

References

External links
RemyZero.com

1998 albums
Remy Zero albums
Geffen Records albums
Albums produced by David Bottrill